Sun Bigan (June 1941 – 12 January 2022) was a Chinese diplomat who served as the ambassador to several Middle Eastern countries and as China’s Special Envoy on Middle East Issues. 

He served as Chinese Ambassador to Saudi Arabia from 1990 to 1994, Chinese Ambassador to Iraq from 1994 to 1998, and Chinese Ambassador to Iran from 1999 to 2002. Sun was also part of the team that re-established the Chinese embassy in Baghdad.

From 2006 to 2009, Sun served as China’s Special Envoy on Middle East Issues. During his tenure, China heavily criticized Israel for its disproportionate use of force against Lebanon in 2006.

He died on 12 January 2022, at the age of 80.

References

1941 births
2022 deaths
Ambassadors of China to Iran
Ambassadors of China to Iraq
Ambassadors of China to Saudi Arabia
Chinese diplomats